RFA Scotol was a 1000-ton class tanker of the British Royal Fleet Auxiliary.

The ship was built by the Tyne Iron Shipbuilding Co. Ltd., at Willington Quay, Howdon, Northumberland, and launched on 23 June 1916. First used as a Port Oiler at Dover, and then stationed at Portland until August 1947, the ship was sold to  Hemsley Bell Ltd (H.L.R. Bell, Managers) Southampton on 21 April 1948 and renamed Hemsley I.

The ship ran aground and was wrecked at Fox Cove on 12 May 1969 off Porthcothan, Cornwall, en route from Liverpool to the breakers at Antwerp.

References

1916 ships
Ships built on the River Tyne
Tankers of the Royal Fleet Auxiliary
Cornish shipwrecks